Moses Odhiambo (born 13 April 1986) is a Kenyan international footballer who plays for Sofapaka, as a striker.

Career
Born in Nairobi, Odhiambo has played club football for Tusker, Moro United, Simba, APR, Young Africans, Gor Mahia, Thika United, Ushuru and Sofapaka.

He made his international debut for Kenya in 2004, earning two caps.

References

1986 births
Living people
Kenyan footballers
Kenya international footballers
Tusker F.C. players
Moro United F.C. players
Simba S.C. players
APR F.C. players
Young Africans S.C. players
Gor Mahia F.C. players
Thika United F.C. players
Ushuru F.C. players
Sofapaka F.C. players
Kenyan Premier League players
Association football forwards
Kenyan expatriate footballers
Kenyan expatriate sportspeople in Tanzania
Expatriate footballers in Tanzania
Kenyan expatriate sportspeople in Rwanda
Expatriate footballers in Rwanda
Tanzanian Premier League players